Pan-Thaiism (otherwise known as Pan-Taiism, the pan-Thai movement, etc.) is an ideology that flourished in Thailand during the 1930s and 1940s. It was a form of irredentism, with the aim of political unification of all Thai people within Thailand, Burma, Malaya, Cambodia, and Laos into a greater Thai state.

Prior to the revolution of 1932, which replaced the absolute monarchy with a constitutional one, the Thai government had pursued good relations with the imperial powers, Britain and France, that ruled its neighbours: Burma, Malaya, Cambodia and Laos. Anti-colonial sentiment had been actively discouraged. The military government that came to power in 1938 under Plaek Phibunsongkhram, however, actively sought to restore "lost" territories. It also aggressively promoted pan-Thaiism. The intellectual architect of the new Thai nationalism was Wichit Wathakan. The country officially changed its name from Siam to Thailand. The word "Thai" was interpreted in an idiosyncratic way. It did not refer only to speakers of Central Thai (Siamese) or even Tai languages generally, but to all those who had once been under the Ayutthaya and Rattanakosin kingdoms.

During World War II, Thailand was able to take advantage of the defeat of France in Europe to seize territory in Cambodia and Laos in a brief war. Following a Japanese invasion of Thailand (December 1941), Thailand made common cause with the Japanese and  occupied parts of Burma and  Malaya. Thai rule was not generally welcomed by the subject populations. In Laos, especially, French authorities promoted rhetoric and reforms of "renovating" Lao culture under Governor-General of Indochina Jean Decoux, but this was mainly used to dampen the appeal of Pan-Thaiism and strengthen Lao cooperation within the French colonial system rather than develop any sense of Lao separatist nationalism. Nonetheless, a counter-irredentism indeed emerged among Lao nationalists who aimed to bring much of northern Thailand under Lao rule. Few of Thailand's new subjects identified as "Thai" in any sense. The war ended in Thailand's defeat and the overthrow of the military government. Thailand returned to its pre-war borders as last adjusted in the Anglo-Siamese Treaty of 1909.

References

Political movements in Asia
Irredentism
Thai nationalism
Thailand in World War II